In science, an effective theory is a scientific theory which proposes to describe a certain set of observations,  but explicitly without the claim or implication that the mechanism used by the theory has a direct counterpart in the actual causes of the observed phenomena to which the theory is fitted. That means that the theory proposes to model a certain effect, without proposing to model adequately any of the causes which contribute to the effect.

For example, effective field theory is a method used to describe physical theories when there is a hierarchy of scales. Effective field theories in physics can include quantum field theories in which the fields are treated as fundamental, and effective theories describing phenomena in solid-state physics. For instance, the BCS theory of superconduction treats vibrations of the solid-state lattice as a "field" (i.e. without claiming that there is really a field), with its own field quanta, known as phonons. Such "effective particles" derived from effective fields are also known as quasiparticles.

In a certain sense, quantum field theory, and any other currently known physical theory, could be described as "effective", as in being the "low energy limit" of an as-yet unknown "Theory of Everything".

See also

Effective mass (solid-state physics)
Emergence
Empirism
Epistemology
Heuristics
Phenomenological model
Phenomenology (physics)
Scientific method
Turing test

References

Scientific theories